The 1945–46 Southern Football League season was the 43rd in the history of the league, an English football competition.

It was the first season after the break caused by World War II.

Not all league competitions resumed in 1945 (the Football League did not restart until 1946–47) and six clubs that had featured in the 1939–40 season had left the league, whilst there were four new clubs, Bedford Town, Colchester United, Swindon Town II and Cardiff City II.

Chelmsford City were champions, winning their first Southern League title. At the end of the season Cardiff City and Swindon Town resigned their second teams from the league.

League table
The table contains an error as the goals for are 515 and the goals against are 513.

References

Southern Football League seasons
S